Albert Pierre Jules Joseph Bayet (1 February 1880, Lyon  – 26 June 1961, Paris) was a French sociologist, professor at both the Sorbonne and the École pratique des hautes études.

Biography 
He was the son of Charles Bayet, Byzantine art historian, director of higher education, and the son-in-law of the historian Alphonse Aulard. He graduated in 1901, becoming a professor at the Lycée Louis-le-Grand in 1922. In 1923, he became directory of studies in the « Histoire des idées morales » [ethics] department of the École pratique des hautes études, later leading ethics courses at the Sorbonne.

He was the president of the French National Press Federation (FNPF) from 25 August 1944 to his death in 1961. After having been clandestine president in 1943 and 1944, participating with writer Victor Charbonnel in the journal L'Action. He also took part in those which, shortly after the liberation, left the Radical party to join the Progressive Union, the 'kindred spirit' to the French Communist Party.

Bayet was a proponent of the Christ myth theory. With Paul-Louis Couchoud and Prosper Alfaric he authored Le Problème de Jésus et les Origines du Christianisme (The Problem of Jesus and Christian Origins, 1932).

Works 
 Les Écrivains politiques du XVIIIe, extracts with an introduction and notes by Albert Bayet and François Albert, 1904
 La Morale scientifique, essai sur les applications morales des sciences sociologiques, 1907
 L'Idée de Bien, essai sur le principe de l'art moral rationnel, 1908
 Les Idées mortes, 1908
 Le Mirage de la vertu, 1912
 La Casuistique chrétienne contemporaine, 1913
 Le Suicide et la Morale, 1922 ; 1975 ; 2007
 La Science des faites moraux, 1925
 Notre morale, 1926
 Les Morales de l'Évangile, 1927
 Le Livre de morale des écoles primaires. Cours moyen et supérieur, 1928
 Les Provinciales de Pascal, 1929
 Histoire de la morale en France, 2 vol., 1930-1931
 La Morale de la Science, 1931 ; 1947
 Le Problème de Jésus et les Origines du Christianisme,  with  et Paul-Louis Couchoud, 1932
 Le Radicalisme, 1932
 Pacifisme et Christianisme aux premiers siècles, 1934
 Attentats et terreur : instruments de conquête politique, Comité franco-espagnol, brochure, 1937
 Histoire de France, 1938
 Qu'est-ce que le rationalisme ? 1939
 Histoire de la Déclaration des droits de l'homme : du 89 politique au 89 économique, 1939
 Pétain et la Cinquième Colonne, 1944 (publié clandestinement durant l'Occupation)
 Les Pensées de Pascal, 1948
 Pour une réconciliation française. Laïcité XXe, 1958
 Histoire de la libre-pensée, 1959 ; « Que sais-je ? » 848, 1970

References

Further reading 
 Francis-Vincent Féraud, Christiane et Monique Bayet, La Vraie Légende d'Albert Bayet, Nouvelles Éditions latines, 1965.

1880 births
1961 deaths
Christ myth theory proponents
Writers from Lyon
French sociologists
École Normale Supérieure alumni
Academic staff of the École pratique des hautes études
Human Rights League (France) members
Grand Officiers of the Légion d'honneur